John Youl (1932 – 27 September 2009) was an Australian motor racing driver, race track owner and prominent Tasmanian grazier.

Youl was best known for his driving in open wheel racing cars during the 1950s and 1960s and by the 60's was one of the most prominent Australians of this discipline. His career highlight came in 1962 when he finished second in the Australian Grand Prix behind international grand prix racer Bruce McLaren at the Caversham airfield circuit.

A twice runner-up in the CAMS Gold Star for the Australian Drivers' Championship, Youl raced in the inaugural Tasman Series in 1964 before stepping away from the sport as a competitor. He remained close to the sport however, developing Symmons Plains Raceway on part of the family's grazing land in northern Tasmania.

Youl was also a prominent member of the Tasmanian grazing community.

Career results

Complete Tasman Series results

References

1932 births
2009 deaths
People educated at Launceston Church Grammar School
Sportspeople from Launceston, Tasmania
Racing drivers from Tasmania
Tasman Series drivers
John